Cymindis portugalica is a species of ground beetle in the subfamily Harpalinae. It was described by Jedlicka in 1946.

References

portugalica
Beetles described in 1946